The Palm Spring Formation is a Pleistocene Epoch geologic formation in the eastern Colorado Desert of Imperial County and San Diego County County, Southern California.

Geology
The Palm Spring Formation is an extensively-exposed delta-plain deposit debouched by the ancestral Colorado River across the subsiding Salton Trough. It records the development of the prehistoric Colorado River delta cone into a barrier excluding marine waters from the Salton Trough.

Fossils
It preserves fossils from the Pleistocene Epoch, during the Quaternary Period of the Cenozoic Era.

Lower Pliocene sub−period petrified wood is found in Anza-Borrego Desert State Park. The Lauraceae is represented by petrified Umbellularia, the Salicaceae with petrified Populus and Salix, and the Juglandaceae with petrified Juglans.

See also

 Ocotillo Formation — fluvial-alluvial fan Pliocene formation''
 
 List of fossiliferous stratigraphic units in California
 Paleontology in California

References

Further reading
 

Pleistocene California
Pleistocene geology
Colorado Desert
Geology of Imperial County, California
Geology of San Diego County, California
Anza-Borrego Desert State Park
Pleistocene Series of North America
Geologic formations of California